The Banu Ammar were a family of Shia Muslim magistrates (qadis) who ruled the city of Tripoli in what is now Lebanon from c.1065 until 1109.

History

Accounts vary regarding the origin of Banu Ammar. While some describe them as descendants of the Kutama Berber tribe, which provided the mainstay of the early Fatimid Caliphate, other accounts describe them as members of the Arab Banu Tayy tribe.
Members of the family served as qadis in Tyre 940, and in Jubayl in 990. 

The dynasty in Tripoli was founded by Amin al-Dawla Abu Talib al-Hasan ibn Ammar, who was the Fatimid-appointed qadi of Tripoli when the local Fatimid governor, Mukhtar al-Dawla ibn Bazzal, died circa 1065. Amin al-Dawla declared himself the independent ruler of the town, ruling a territory extending from Akkar in the north to Jubayl (Byblos) in the south. His reign was brief, as he died only two years later.

Amin al-Dawla's two nephews fought for the succession, with one of them, Jalal al-Mulk Ali ibn Muhammad, emerging victorious and exiling his brother. Jalal al-Mulk ruled until his death in 1099, ruling the city in a precarious diplomatic balancing act between the Fatimids to the south and the Seljuks to the east. In 1081, he captured Jableh from the Byzantine Empire. As part of his strategy to enhance Tripoli's position, he invested large sums in turning the city a famous centre for learning, founding a "House of Knowledge" that attracted scholars, as well as a notable library of reportedly 100,000 volumes.

He was succeeded by his brother, Fakhr al-Mulk, whose accession coincided with the arrival of the First Crusade. At this point the Banu Ammar's territory spanned the port town of Tartus and the fortresses of Arqa, north of Tripoli, and Khawabi, north of Tartus, in addition to Tripoli, Jubayl and Jableh. Fakhr al-Mulk had to face the continuous attacks of the Crusaders under Raymond of Saint-Gilles. Tartus was captured in 1099, but recaptured by the Banu Ammar until falling firmly into Crusader hands under Raymond in April 1102. The family lost Byblos to Raymond in April 1104. He left the city in 1108 to rally the Sunni rulers at Damascus and Baghdad to his assistance, but was deposed by the populace in a pro-Fatimid revolt. The Fatimids sent a fleet to the city, but it arrived only eight days after its fall to the Crusaders. In July 1109 the Crusaders under Tancred captured Jableh. Fakhr al-Mulk remained in the service of the Seljuks, and then entered the service of the atabeg Mawdud of Mosul, and finally of the Abbasid caliph al-Mustazhir. He died in 1118/9.

References

Sources
 
 
 
 

Medieval Lebanon
History of Tripoli, Lebanon
Shia dynasties
Berber dynasties
Kutama